Staurinidia is a genus of Ediacaran soft-bodied organism from the deposits of the Ust'-Pinega formation. It is a monotypic genus and only contains the species Staurinidia crucicula. The genus was first described in 1985 by Russian palaeontologist Mikhail A. Fedonkin. S. crucicula'''s four-fold symmetry is present as a result of four canals radiating from the middle of a small cavity in the middle of the body. Other forms with four way symmetry, mainly Medusoid forms, from the Ediacaran (Conomedusites, Persimedusites) comprise an essential chunk of the Ediacaran diversity of symmetry; their organisations are of typical to that of a modern-day Scyphozoan Cnidarian although much smaller compared to them.

 Description S. crucicula fossils are preserved as a small discoidal form baring four radial canals emitting from the fossils centre in which a small cavity is present. The ends of the canals are often swollen when pointing towards the organisms periphery. In very rare instances, tentacles are present and preserved around the outside of the disc's margin. The margins of the disc are very thin with there being no indication of an encircling ridge or canal. Rather deep impressions are preserved of Staurinidia suggesting that the animal would've had significant relief. 

The canals 
give the animal a four-fold symmetry typical to that of other Ediacaran Cnidarians. Staurinidia is regarded as one of the simplest of all Ediacaran Cnidarians that show four-way rotational axis.

See also 
List of Ediacaran genera

References 

Ediacaran
Ediacaran life
Ediacaran first appearances
Prehistoric animal taxa
Scyphozoa
Enigmatic prehistoric animal genera
Cnidarian taxa